Archibald Grant may refer to:

Sir Archibald Grant, 2nd Baronet (1696–1778), MP for Aberdeenshire 1722–1732
Sir Archibald Grant, 3rd Baronet (1731–1796), of the Grant baronets
Sir Archibald Grant, 4th Baronet (1760–1820), of the Grant baronets
Sir Archibald Grant, 7th Baronet (1823–1884), of the Grant baronets
Sir Archibald Grant, 13th Baronet (born 1954), of the Grant baronets
Archie Grant (Archibald Brewster Grant, 1904–1970), New Zealand railway worker and trade unionist